Candiac (also designated exo4, formerly known as Delson-Candiac) is a commuter railway line in Greater Montreal, Quebec, Canada. It is operated by Exo, the organization that operates public transport services across this region.

The Candiac line was originally operated by the Canadian Pacific Railway (CPR) as part of its South-Eastern railway line between Windsor Station and Farnham from 1887 until 1980. The former AMT resumed passenger service on this line in 2001, while Exo assumed current service on June 1, 2017.

There are nine inbound and nine outbound trains each weekday.

Overview
This line links the Lucien-L'Allier station in downtown Montreal with Candiac, on Montreal's South Shore.

The line offers nine departures every weekday towards Montreal and nine return trips to Candiac every weekday. Most departures are during rush hour, but three are offered during off-peak hours in each direction.

History

AMT service
The former Agence Métropolitaine de Transport (AMT) started service on this line on September 4, 2001 with two round trips every day.  One trainset was used for both departures.  In September 2003, service was increased to four round trips per day and a second trainset was used. Service was extended to Candiac in 2005, at which point the line was renamed as the Delson-Candiac line. In 2009, two additional departures were added in each direction with leased trainsets being used until new locomotives and rolling stock is received.

Service on the line was suspended from February 17, 2006 to March 9, 2006 after the derailment of six Canadian Pacific freight cars on February 17.  The freight cars derailed on the Saint-Laurent Railway Bridge used by the train service.  This was one of the longest disruptions in train service for the AMT. High winds were a factor in that derailment. In September 2013 CP banned AMT's multilevel coaches from the bridge during high wind conditions (85 km/h or more), deeming them potentially unstable in such conditions. Since then AMT has used only its single-level 700 series coaches on this line.

The line was renamed on July 1, 2010 from "Delson-Candiac" to simply "Candiac" to standardize formatting across the network.

On January 16, 2017, a new station named Du Canal was opened on Saint-Joseph Boulevard in Lachine. This project was part of the MTQ's mitigation measures for the reconstruction of the Turcot interchange.

RTM service

On June 1, 2017, the AMT was dissolved and replaced by two new governing bodies, the Autorité régionale de transport métropolitain (ARTM) and the Réseau de transport métropolitain (RTM). The RTM took over all former AMT services, including this line.

In May 2018, the RTM rebranded itself as Exo, and in that process updated all line names with a number each and updated their line colours. The Candiac line became Exo 4, and its line colour was updated to a lighter pastel shade of green.

Future projects

To improve service and attract new users on the Candiac line, the ARTM will carry out two major projects:
 Improve railway infrastructure on the Adirondack/Lacolle subdivision. The $20-million project includes improving signaling, adding a siding for freight trains, refurbishing switches and improving pedestrian crossings. Work was scheduled to be completed by 2014.
 Build a new layover facility (overnight service and storage yard) at the end of the line. Construction is linked to the railway improvement project above.

The possibility of extending the Candiac Line another 20 kilometres beyond the new layover facility to Saint-Jean-sur-Richelieu and Saint-Philippe was also examined by the Quebec Government in 2014. In 2016, the study's final report rejected that option, citing longer travel times by train for people in the area.

List of stations
These stations are on the Candiac line:

The commuter line operates over these Canadian Pacific Railway lines:

Note: South Junction is not a passenger stop.

References

External links
Official RTM website

Exo commuter rail lines
Transport in Montérégie
Railway lines opened in 2001
Railway lines opened in 1887
Rail transport in Roussillon Regional County Municipality